Aperusia is a genus of moths in the family Geometridae described by Warren in 1905.

Species
Aperusia albifascia Dognin, 1918
Aperusia punctistriata Warren, 1905

References

Larentiinae
Geometridae genera